Barretto National High School, formerly known as Barragay High School then changed to Barretto High School, is a school in Barrangay Barretto, Olongapo City, Province of Zambales, Philippines.  It is located at Rizal Street.

High schools in Zambales
Schools in Olongapo